Linthicum Heights Historic District is a national historic district at Linthicum Heights, Anne Arundel County, Maryland. It consists of a suburban community surrounding the intersection of Camp Meade Road (MD 170) and Maple Road.  The community is situated on a series of low hills about three miles south of the Patapsco River and includes 17 tree-shaded streets created originally as a planned railroad suburb on the lines connecting Baltimore, Annapolis, and Washington, beginning in 1908. The district consists of 254 contributing resources, including two churches, a cemetery, and a former commercial/residential building.  Most of the housing was built prior to 1939 and include examples of the Bungalow, American Foursquare, Colonial Revival, Dutch Revival, and Tudor Revival styles.

It was listed on the National Register of Historic Places in 2006.

Gallery

References

External links
, including photo from 2005, at Maryland Historical Trust
Where We Live: A Small Town Few Want to Leave, Though Near BWI Linthicum Has a Neighborhood Feel, The Washington Post, July 11, 2009.

Historic districts in Anne Arundel County, Maryland
Historic districts on the National Register of Historic Places in Maryland
Linthicum, Maryland
National Register of Historic Places in Anne Arundel County, Maryland
1908 establishments in Maryland